White City was an amusement park located in Shrewsbury, a suburb of Worcester, Massachusetts. It bordered Lake Quinsigamond and ran from 1905 to 1960.

History

White City was founded by local businessman Horace H. Bigelow. The park opened on June 18, 1905 and was open for 55 seasons, closing for the last time on September 5, 1960. Its lifespan was atypical of American amusement parks of its day (most of which were short-lived, failing to survive past the onset of World War I). Like many such parks, White City was a trolley park, built at the end of a trolley line to increase ridership on weekends.

White City bordered Lake Quinsigamond and included the waters of the lake in some its attractions, such as boat rides, the "Whirl of Air Ships" ride which swung patrons out over the water, and trained diving horses. White City's other attractions were typical of parks of this type: a midway, a fun house, a penny arcade, concession stands, rides, sideshow acts, a roller coaster. White City also included a roller-skating rink, a ballroom, and a stage where musical acts and, later, pop stars (Paul Anka, Jerry Vale, Edie Gorme) performed.

The park's original roller coaster opened in 1914.. It was replaced by a world-class (at the time) coaster, the Zip, in 1928. The Zip, designed by Herbert Schenck, remained in service until the park's closing, although it was later renamed the Cyclone and later still the Yankee Clipper.

An early White City tagline was "Land of Fifty Thousand Electric Lights", which is sometimes cited as the source of the park's name, along with the white color of its structures. Most likely, though, the park was named for the famous White City at the 1893 Chicago World's Fair. "White City" was a popular name for amusement parks of the time, being borne by parks in Springfield (Missouri), Atlanta, Chicago, Cleveland, Indianapolis, New Haven, New Orleans, Syracuse (New York), London, Sydney, Melbourne, and other places as well.

After the park closed, the White City Plaza shopping center was built on part of the  site.

See also

Lake Quinsigamond
Lincoln Park
List of amusement parks in New England
List of defunct amusement parks

References

 Article, "Lake Quinsigamond And White City"
European Coaster Club database
incoasterpaedia
Brief history of Lake Quinsigamond

Bibliography
 Perna, Michael Jr. Lake Quinsigamond and White City Amusement Park (Images of America series), Arcadia Publishing, 2004.

External links

 Brief history of White City

Local reminisces of  White City
Brief biography of Horace Holly Bigelow, founder of White City

Amusement parks in Massachusetts
Defunct amusement parks in the United States
1905 establishments in Massachusetts
1960 disestablishments in Massachusetts
Buildings and structures in Shrewsbury, Massachusetts